Norma Curtis (b. Wales) is a British novelist and short story writer. Her debut novel, Living It Up, Living It Down has been awarded the Romantic Novelists' Association New Writing Award in 1994, and later she was elected its twentieth Chairman (1999–2001).

Biography
Norma Curtis was born near Wrexham, Wales, United Kingdom, but now she lives in London, England. She is married  Paul, and they had a son, Joe.

Bibliography

Single novels
Living It Up, Living It Down (1995)
The House Husband (1996) aka Quality Time
The Last Place You Look (1998)
Holy Bones and Ava Jones (2013)
Striking a Balance (2015)
The Drowned Village (2022)
The Hideaway        (2022)

References and sources

                   

Welsh romantic fiction writers
Year of birth missing (living people)
Living people